This is a list of Arizona Wildcats football players in the NFL Draft.

Key

Selections

Notes
Darryl Goodlow was selected in the 1984 NFL Supplemental Draft.

References

External links
 

Arizona

Arizona Wildcats NFL Draft